A dolceola is a musical instrument resembling a miniature piano, but which is in fact a zither with a keyboard. It has an unusual, angelic, music-box sound.  Dolceolas were made by the Toledo Symphony Company from 1903 to 1907.

Performers
Paul Mason Howard accompanied Lead Belly on dolceola on some of his 1944 Capitol Records sides. A listen to those recordings, collected under the title Grasshoppers In My Pillow, reveals the characteristic clatter of the dolceola's three-level keyboard action.

The gospel and gospel blues musician Washington Phillips (18801954) has been said to have played a dolceola on his recordings, but his instrument was in fact called a "dulceola", and was a home-made fingered fretless zither.

Alex Turner of English band Arctic Monkeys plays the dolceola on the band's 2018 album Tranquility Base Hotel & Casino.

References

 The Dolceola: a piano? A zither? Or what?. Miner Music
 A New Musical Instrument. Dunn's Review, Vol. 11, 1908

See also
Autoharp 
Marxophone

Keyboard instruments
Zithers
1903 musical instruments